Mukhtar Masood (15 December 192615 April 2017) was a renowned Pakistani Urdu writer and bureaucrat.

Early life and career
Born in Sialkot, Punjab, British India on 15 December 1926, to Shaikh Ataullah (1896 - 1968), a well-known literary scholar and professor of economics at the Aligarh Muslim University originally from Jalalpur Jattan in the Gujrat district of Punjab, Masood was a graduate of the Aligarh Muslim University as well in 1948. He migrated to Pakistan after partition of India in 1948. In 1949, he passed Central Superior Services (CSS) examination and went on to serve at different important positions such as commissioner and federal secretary.

During his career, he served as chairman of the Pakistan Industrial Development Corporation (PIDC), chairman of the Agricultural Development Bank of Pakistan and secretary-general of the Regional Cooperation for Development (RCD).

He wrote four books – Awaz-e-Dost, Safer Naseeb, Harf-e-Shouq, Loh-e-Ayyam – all of which are highly regarded in literary circles of Pakistan for their elegant prose and immaculate style. His last book was Harf-i-shouq that was published in July 2017.

Playwright Asghar Nadeem Syed reportedly said, "Mukhtar Masood was a great writer with a style similar to Qudratullah Shahab. His writings incorporated a spiritual colour, but the best thing about his work was the information it contained. He was fond of study which is why whatever he wrote was very comprehensive".

He played an important role in the construction of Minar-e-Pakistan historic monument in Lahore, Pakistan. He was serving as Lahore's deputy commissioner at that time and took keen interest in the execution of the construction project. This historic national monument was constructed in the 1960s during the Ayub Khan's regime. His contribution in construction of Mangla and Tarbela Dams of Pakistan is also vital. He established a state-of-the-art school and college at Chowki Village of Azad Jammu & Kashmir, Pakistan and also donated all his personal books and library to the said school. He was a real patriot and a true Pakistani.

Awards and recognition 
 To honor his contributions to Pakistani literature, he was awarded Sitara-i-Imtiaz (Star of Excellence) Award by the President of Pakistan in 2004.
 'Aalmi Frogh-e-Urdu Adab' (World Promotion of Urdu Literature) Award in 2010.

Death
He died in Lahore, Pakistan on 15 April 2017. Among the survivors are two sons and a daughter.

Bibliography

Books by him
Eye witnesses of history; a collection of letters addressed to Quaid-i-Azam, 1968. Edited by Mukhtar Masood.
Āvāz-i dost, 1973. An account of the Pakistan Movement.
Safar naṣīb, 1981. Reminiscences of a Pakistani civil service officer; include travel impressions of different parts of the world.
Lauḥ-i ayyām, 1996. On the Islamic revolution of Iran, 1979, written by a civil servant who had been there for four years during the revolution.
Ḥarf-i shauq, 2018. Autobiographical reminiscences of an Urdu author and ex-civil servant of Pakistan, with special reference to his college life at Aligarh Muslim University, include one chapter on Sir Sayyid Aḥmad K̲h̲ān̲ (1817–1898).

Books about him
Muk̲h̲tār Masʻūd kā uslūb, 2013, by Alt̤āf Yūsufzaʼī. Critical study of his works.

References

1926 births
2017 deaths
Aligarh Muslim University alumni
Urdu-language writers
Pakistani writers
Pakistani civil servants
Punjabi people
People from Sialkot
Recipients of Sitara-i-Imtiaz